LDD may refer to:

 Learning difficulties and disabilities (UK)
 Lego Digital Designer, a CAD software application for designing Lego models
 Lhermitte–Duclos disease, a rare, slowly growing tumor of the cerebellum
 Libertarian, Direct, Democratic, a Belgian political party
 Lidhja Demokratike e Dardanisë (English: Democratic League of Dardania), a political party in Kosovo
 Local development document, a set of documents specified in United Kingdom planning law
 Local Dialing Disparity
 Lycée Denis Diderot (Kenya), a French international school in Nairobi, Kenya
 Lightly Doped Drain, a sub-structure in a MOSFET that is intended to permit operation with higher drain-source voltage
 Long Distance Dedication, a feature on the weekly syndicated radio program American Top 40
 ldd (Unix) is a *nix utility to List Dynamic Dependencies
 Living Dead Dolls
 Lymantria dispar dispar, a species of moth (gypsy moth)
 Liquid Detainment Device, a box shaped machine designed to drain excess liquid in recyclable bottles and encourage people to remove the bottle caps. Created and patented by Gunnar Engineering.